Octave Pirmez (1832 – May 1883) was a Belgian author born in Châtelineau.

Life
Octave belonged to a well-known Belgian family. His cousin, Edouard Pirmez, was distinguished for his works on literary and political subjects. He lived an uneventful life at his family's château at Acoz, in Gerpinnes in Hainaut, where he died.

Works
Pirmez was an ardent admirer of the French Romanticists. His works include:
Les Feuillees: pensées et maximes (1862)
Victor Hugo (1863)
Jours de solitude (1869)
Rémo: Souvenir d'un frère (1880); 
Heures de philosophie (1881); 
(posthumous) Lettres à José (1884).
These books form a history of his emotional life, and reveal an extreme melancholy.

References
See  (1888), by Adolphe Siret and José de Coppin.

1832 births
1883 deaths
Belgian writers in French